Ângelo Girão (born 28 August 1989) is a Portuguese roller hockey player. He is the goalkeeper and captain of Sporting CP.

For Portugal, he was European champion in 2016 and world champion in 2019.

References

1989 births
Living people
Portuguese roller hockey players
Sporting CP roller hockey players
Sportspeople from Porto